PCDH11Y is a gene unique to Homo males that encodes Protocadherin 11Y, a protein that guides the development of nerve cells.  PCDH11X, located on the X chromosome, is common, in both sexes, to humans and our nearest relative, the chimpanzee; however, PCDH11Y, located on the Y chromosome, is unique to males. 

In terms of human evolution, it has been estimated that pcdh11x "gene jumped" from X to Y around three million years ago; coincident with increased human brain size and the first use of tools. Furthermore,  around 120,000 to 200,000 years ago, the PCDH11Y gene was able to further transform, splitting in half and reversing its position. 

PCDH11X/Y are cadherin family genes. They make proteins, involved in signalling, that attach to the surface of nerve cells. PCDH11X and PCDH11Y, respond in different ways to Retinoic acid, a chemical involved in the development of embryos.  The acid stimulates the  activity of PCDH11Y but suppresses PCDH11X.  This is likely one of the explanations for the differences between the brains of men and women.

Psychiatrist, professor Tim Crow, also believes the gene explains lateralisation. Humans have "lateralised" brains, in which the different sides became specialised for particular jobs. For instance 90% of people will use their right hands for fiddly tasks. A chimpanzee is just as likely to use either hand. It also explains why, for right-handed people, linguistic functions are concentrated on the left side of the brain.

References